Stephen J. Buoniconti (born September 4, 1969 in Holyoke, Massachusetts) is an American politician who represented the Hampden Districfrom the Massachusetts Senate from the year 2005 to 2011 and the 6th Hampden District in the Massachusetts House of Representatives from 2001 to 2005.

Career
He was first elected to the Massachusetts Senate in 2004, taking office in January 2005. Buoniconti served in the Massachusetts House of Representatives from 2001 to 2005. Before being elected to the General Court, Buoniconti served as an Assistant District Attorney in Hampden County and was a member of the West Springfield School Committee (1998–2000) and was a West Springfield Town Meeting Member (1992–1996, 1998–2000).

Education
He earned his B.A. from Fairfield University and his J.D. from Western New England College School of Law.

References

External links
Official Website
Massachusetts Senate Profile

1969 births
Democratic Party Massachusetts state senators
Democratic Party members of the Massachusetts House of Representatives
Politicians from Holyoke, Massachusetts
People from West Springfield, Massachusetts
Living people
Western New England University alumni
Fairfield University alumni